Elephant King is a 2012 album by Trace Bundy.  This 2-disc set includes a full-length studio CD and a full-feature live DVD.

Critical reception
Dave Kirby of the Boulder Weekly said: "What becomes obvious is that, for a guy who has mastered the fiendish intricacies of multi-voiced fingerstyle guitar, the center of the universe is still melody."

Kelly Tasker of Grateful Web reviewed the album and had this to say: "This is Bundy's most diverse and complex effort to date, and he accomplishes it all with finesse and a playful spirit that shines through on every track."

Track listing

Personnel
Trace Bundy - Guitars - Tracks 1-11
Aubrea Alford - violinist - Tracks 3 and 11
Brian McRae - Percussion - Tracks 3,5,9
Dave Wilton - Synthesizer [Moog on an iPhone], and electric guitar, piano and Glockenspiel - Tracks 4,6,10,11
Latifah Phillips - Cello - Track 6
Renee Swick - Clarinet - Track 6

References

External links
Official Trace Bundy web site
Official Myspace profile

Trace Bundy albums
2012 albums